Pishachas are flesh-eating demons in Dharmic religions, appearing in Buddhist and Hindu mythologies. A pishacha is a malevolent being that has often been referred to as the very manifestation of evil.

Mythology 
The Mahabharata states that the original pischaca was the creation of Brahma. The epic offers various interpretations of the being, including its residence in the court of Kubera or Brahma and worshipping the deities of its residence, and its worship of Shiva and Parvati. The Pichachas are described as having fought on the side of Ghatotkacha against Karna. But they are also said to have served the Kauravas, acting as the horses of the chariot of Alambusha. 

Other legends describe them as the sons of either Krodha (figuratively "Anger") or as Dakṣa’s daughter Pischcha. They have been described as having bulging veins and protruding red eyes. They are believed to have their own languages, known as Paiśāci.

According to one legend, they are sons of Kashyapa and Krodhavasa, one of the daughters of Prajapati Daksha. The Nilamata Purana of the 7th century says the valley of Kashmir  was inhabited by two tribes: the Nagas and the Pisachas.

Pischchas like darkness and traditionally are depicted as haunting cremation grounds along with other monsters like bhutas and vetālas. Pischchas are supposed to possess the ability to shapeshift and assume any form at will, and may also become invisible. They also feed on human energy. Sometimes, they possess human beings and alter their thoughts, and the victims are afflicted with a variety of maladies and abnormalities like insanity. Certain mantras are supposed to cure such afflicted persons and drive away the pischcha possessing that particular human being. In order to keep the pischcha away, they are given their share of offerings during certain religious functions and festivals.

Pāṇini, in his Aṣṭādhyāyi, described the pischcha as a "warrior clan". In the ancient literature, the Dardic people in the north of Kashmir were referred to as Pischcha and Dardic languages were called Paiśāci. They are said to have been descendants of Prajāpati Kaśyapa.

Thailand
According to the Royal Institute Dictionary, the Thai term "ปิศาจ" (pisat), from Sanskrit, pischcha, is defined as "ghost" (ผี). Although not strictly Thai ghosts, the Pishacha appear in some stories in Thai folklore. They are among the spirits from the Hindu-Buddhist tradition in Thailand and are also represented in some Buddhist temple paintings. 

Pisaj or Khon Phi Pisat (คน ผี ปีศาจ) is a Thai movie based on a Pishacha story.

See also
 Yakshi
 Kanjirottu Yakshi

References

Sources
 Dictionary of Hindu Lore and Legend by Anna Dhallapiccola

Demons in Hinduism
Hindu legendary creatures
Non-human races in Hindu mythology